Big Al II is a pioneering funny car built in 1963 by Jim Lytle. It started the trend to flip-top fiberglass 'flopper' bodies.

Lytle's chopped '34 Tudor project cost just US$2000, and was powered by an Allison V-1710. The body was hand made.

Big Al II ran just three times, all in 1964 at Lion's Dragway, setting a record for full-bodied drag racers, before being retired.

The idea was copied by Ford and Mercury for their Mercury Comet Cyclones. It would inspire “every flopper body ever formed”.

Notes

Sources

Drag racing cars
1960s cars
Rear-wheel-drive vehicles